This is a list of the National Register of Historic Places listings in northern Chester County, Pennsylvania.

This is intended to be a complete list of the properties and districts on the National Register of Historic Places in northern Chester County, Pennsylvania, United States. Northern Chester County is defined for this list as being the municipalities north of the Philadelphia Main Line and west of a line extending from Phoenixville to Exton. The locations of National Register properties and districts for which the latitude and longitude coordinates are included below, may be seen in a map.

There are 323 properties and districts listed on the Register in Chester County, including 7 National Historic Landmarks. Northern Chester County includes 89 properties and districts, including 2 National Historic Landmarks; the county's remaining properties and districts are listed elsewhere. One district, the Middle Pickering Rural Historic District, is split between northern and eastern Chester County, and is thus included on both lists.

Current listings

|}

Former listing

|}

References

North